Dorcadion enricisturanii is a species of beetle in the family Cerambycidae. It was described by Breuning and Ruspoli in 1971.

References

enricisturanii
Beetles described in 1971